The tennis competitions at the 1993 Mediterranean Games in Languedoc-Roussillon, France from June 16–27.

Athletes competed in 4 events.

Medal summary

Medalists

Medal table
Key:

References

Sports at the 1993 Mediterranean Games
1993
1993 in tennis